Allodemus is a genus of beetles in the family Cerambycidae, containing the following species:

 Allodemus centromaculatus Zajciw, 1968
 Allodemus tricolor (Perty, 1832)

References

Heteropsini